Lake Hamilton is somewhat round with a large cove at its northwest edge. During times of high water levels this peninsula becomes a large island. At least two small islands are also within Lake Hamilton.

Lake Hamilton is one of the largest lakes in the Winter Haven area. Parts of its shoreline are surrounded by residential areas. The lake has a mobile home park on its northeast shore. A golf course borders the lake along all the southwest shore and US Highway 27 runs close to the lake along much of its east shore. A swamp borders the lake at the north end of the cove.

The public has limited access to the shores of this lake. The only public access is at Sample Park, along US 27. This park has a picnic area and a public boat ramp. There are no public swimming areas at Lake Hamilton. Lake Hamilton is part of the north system of the Winter Haven Chain of Lakes. It is connected by a boat lift, which is not currently functioning, in a canal on its west side to Lake Fannie, on its north side to Lake Henry and on its east side to Middle Lake Hamilton. The TakeMeFishing.Org website does not specifically say anything about the fish in this lake. It says The chain of lakes of which it is a part contain largemouth bass, black crappie and  bluegill.

References

Hamilton